Éric Coquerel (born 30 December 1958) is a French politician representing La France Insoumise. He was elected to the French National Assembly on 18 June 2017, representing the department of Seine-Saint-Denis. In 2022, following the parliamentary elections, he was elected chair of the Finance Committee.

Accusations of inappropriate behaviour with women 

Rumors have long circulated about his behaviour with women. He is formally accused on July 2, 2022 of "inappropriate gestures" by a former figure of the Yellow Vests, Sophie Tissier. The latter declares having seized the committee against sexual violence of La France Insoumise.

See also
 2017 French legislative election

References

1958 births
Living people
Deputies of the 15th National Assembly of the French Fifth Republic
La France Insoumise politicians
People from Courbevoie
Politicians from Île-de-France
Members of Parliament for Seine-Saint-Denis
Deputies of the 16th National Assembly of the French Fifth Republic